Circus Maximus is a board game that was originally published by Battleline Publications in 1979, but is better known for the 1980 Avalon Hill edition. The game has become very popular at gaming conventions in an oversized form, with -long boards and baseball-sized chariots.

Description
Circus Maximus is a chariot-racing board game Up to eight players choose teams of horses and drivers, and race their custom chariots around an oval track. Charioteers are encouraged to physically attack their opponents with whips, force opposing chariots into walls, and hamstring opponents' horses with wheel-mounted blades.

Publication history
Circus Maximus, designed by Michael E. Matheny, was originally called Chariot Racing when it was published in 1979 by Battleline Publications, a subsidiary of Heritage Models. (Chariot Racing and a one-on-one combat game called Gladiator were sold together under the name Circus Maximus.) When Battleline was sold to Avalon Hill in October 1979, the new owners published the two components of Circus Maximus as two separate games. While Gladiator retained its original title, Chariot Racing was renamed Circus Maximus. Don Greenwood worked on the second edition.

Reception
In the September 1979 edition of Dragon, Tim Kask was effusive in his praise of the original Chariot Racing, saying, "To put it simply, it is the best treatment of chariot racing that I have seen to date. The rules are ridiculously simple, as are the actual mechanics of the game. There are campaign rules that allow you to set up entire racing seasons; there are rules for accruing experience by continued racing and high placement. There are even provisions for skullduggery and sabotage. The game itself moves very fast and seldom gets boring. In the greatest movie traditions, you can outfit your cart with scythe blades and chop up your opponent’s wheels, or flog his horses to spook them or lash enemy drivers. Shades of great sport, even if your chariot tips over and drags your driver to his doom under the thundering hooves of the other teams."

In 2007, almost 30 years after its original publication, Circus Maximus was chosen for the book Hobby Games: The 100 Best. Stan! commented "There are a lot of very good racing games out there, set against a wide variety of interesting backdrops, everything from cavemen riding dinosaurs through Formula One racers on real-world tracks and on to spaceships hurtling through interstellar space. So what is it that makes Circus Maximus stand out as, far and away, my favorite of the bunch? Is it the Imperial Roman setting? The elegant mechanics? The way the game encourages players to work together while still competing? I can't really say that it's any of those things, but rather that it's all of those things together."

Reviews
Games

References

External links

Avalon Hill games
Battleline Publications games
Board games introduced in 1979
Don Greenwood games